The so-iuy mullet (Planiliza haematocheilus), also known as the haarder, redlip mullet or so-iny mullet, is a species of fish in the family Mugilidae.

Previously the species was included in the genus Mugil (as Mugil soiuy), but is now considered a member of the genus Planiliza.

Range
The natural range of the species is in the Northwest Pacific, from Hokkaido and the Amur River in the north along the coasts of Korea and China to Vietnam in the south. Introduced by humans for aquaculture in the Sea of Azov and the Black Sea before entering the northern Aegean Sea, where it was first recorded in 1998, via the Sea of Marmara.

Parasites
There are 69 known species of parasites of Planiliza haematocheilus.

References

Fish of East Asia
Fish of Japan
Fish of China
Fish of Russia
Fish of Europe
Fish of the Pacific Ocean
So-iuy mullet
Taxa named by Coenraad Jacob Temminck
Taxa named by Hermann Schlegel
Fish described in 1845